Estancia Río Cisnes Airport,  is an airport serving the Lago Verde commune in the Aysén Region of Chile.

There are nearby hills northwest of the airport.

See also

Transport in Chile
List of airports in Chile

References

External links
OpenStreetMap - Estancia Río Cisnes
OurAirports - Estancia Río Cisnes
FallingRain - Estancia Río Cisnes Airport

Airports in Aysén Region